Libystes is a genus of crabs, containing six species:
Libystes edwardsi Alcock, 1899
Libystes lepidus Takeda & Miyake, 1970
Libystes nitidus A. Milne-Edwards, 1867
Libystes paucidentatus Stephenson & Campbell, 1960
Libystes vietnamensis Tien, 1969
Libystes villosus Rathbun, 1924

References

Portunoidea